Comptus badius, the Navassa galliwasp, is a species of lizard of the Diploglossidae family endemic to Navassa Island.

Taxonomy
It was formerly classified in the genus Celestus, but was moved to Comptus in 2021.

References

Comptus
Reptiles described in 1868
Taxa named by Edward Drinker Cope